Hossein Aslani (Persian: حسین اصلانی) -- also known as Gregory H. Aslani, was an Iranian American composer.

He was born in the Rasht village of Shahghaji of Gilan, Iran in 1936 and died on January 28, 2020, in Rockland County of New York, United States. After elementary education, he moved alone to Tehran. While completing high school and earning basic subsistence in labor-intensive daily jobs, he entered the music world by mastering accordion.

Recommended by a close clarinet virtuoso friend the late Hossein Shahverdi, he entered the international conservatory of music in Tehran in Vahdat Hall in 1958. He was trained under the tutelage of renowned western classical music scholars of the era in piano by Tatania Kharatian, music theory and solfeggio by Feredun Farzaneh, and harmony and orchestration by Houshang Ostovar.

Hossein Aslani was also invited to join the national radio Iran as a composer, arranger and pianist in 1965. In an era when Pop music was still regarded as an artistic classic genre, Aslani was instrumental in popularizing it among the youth in particular, through his innovative polyphonic and independent melodic lines. He employed wind instrument ensembles, electric guitar and percussion. This was manifest through performances by the late vocalist Mohammad Nouri and many other singers of the era during 1968–71. Concurrently, with his professional endeavors, he has tirelessly continued piano instructions since 1960. Aslani's first written composition was a piece for piano and orchestra, conducted by Feredun Shahbazian, and performed by the Grand National Radio Orchestra in 1971.
 
This popular notoriety prompted Aslani's involuntary emigration to New York U. S. A. and his trials and tribulations that followed in a foreign land. Committed for life to contemporary music as anchored on his intrinsic affinity and love for music, he earned his master's degree in music composition from the State University of New York Conservatory of Music specializing in contemporary music and orchestration. His lifelong cooperation with his university mentors as Professors Dary John Mizelle and Joel Thome for 20th century harmony, Suzanne Farrin for music literature and critique, Steven Lubin for classic, Brady Brookshire and Stuart Isakoff for music analysis as perceived by the musicians and listeners, has continued.

His work has remained most inspired by the folkloric music of Gilan and other regions of his motherland Iran, combined with nostalgic melancholy of his early years as well as his extensive research of the works of renowned Master contemporary composers Charles Ives, Aaron Copland, Igor Stravinsky, John Cage, Bella Bartok, Leonard Bernstein and Houshang Ostovar. Aslani's unique approach to contemporary music is deemed progressive; nonetheless, emanated from noble well rooted origins. This has thus far yielded a number of pieces and proses that are multidimensional and unimaginable at times.

The twenty-sixth session of the Pelke Tehran was held on August 26, 2015, at the premises of the Iranian Artists Forum, the issue of "contemporary Iranian Modern music by looking Through the works of Hossein Aslani" was discussed by Dr.Mohammad Sarir, Nader Mashayekhi, Mehran Purmandan, Bijan Zelli, Ali Ahmadifar and Soroush Riyazi.

Works  

 A piece for brass
 A Piece for Piano and Orchestra 1970
 A Piece for Piano and Orchestra 2004
 Beyond Solitude for piano & flute2010
 Bridge2010
 Chahragah for piano
 Hope & Hopelessness for solo piano 2005
 Persian Bridge Synthetic-Electronic2003
 Blind Alleys2010
 A piece for brass2010 
 Solo for flute
 String Quartet
 Symbolic Emotion
 The moments of solitudes 1971
 The waiting prairie 1970
 The moonlight in the Orchard 1971
 A shadow at midnight 1971
 Her image 1970
 The wandering wave 1970
 The waiting prairie 1970
 The gipsy hoopla 1971
 In the memory
 Apprension 1971
 The hallucinating contemplation at night1970
 The moonlit lake tale 1970
 Without thou 1970
 The Saharan wild flowers
 The lover's companion 1971
 LIFE Life (2006 for purchase College)

Gallery

References

20th-century Iranian musicians
Iranian emigrants to the United States